The 2022 Westminster City Council election took place on 5 May 2022. All 54 members of Westminster City Council have been elected. The elections took place alongside local elections in the other London boroughs and elections to local authorities across the United Kingdom.

In the previous election in 2018, the Conservative Party had maintained their longstanding control of the council, winning 41 out of the 60 seats with the Labour Party forming the council opposition with the remaining 19 seats. However, Labour managed to win an 8-seat council majority for the first time since the formation of the modern city in 1964. The 2022 election took place under new election boundaries, reducing the number of councillors to 54.

Background

History 

The thirty-two London boroughs were established in 1965 by the London Government Act 1963. They are the principal authorities in Greater London and have responsibilities including education, housing, planning, highways, social services, libraries, recreation, waste, environmental health and revenue collection. Some of the powers are shared with the Greater London Authority, which also manages passenger transport, police, and fire.

Westminster City Council had continuously been under Conservative Party control since its establishment. In the most recent election in 2018, Westminster was considered a key target for Labour in London. The Conservatives won the election, with 41 seats on 42.8% of the vote across the borough while Labour won 19 seats with 41.1% of the vote.

Council term 

The Conservative councillor Robert Davis, who represented Lancaster Gate and had served on the council since 1982, resigned after an investigation into his conduct found that he broke the councillors' code of conduct for receiving a large number of gifts and hospitality from property developers. The 22 November 2018 by-election was held for the Conservatives by Margot Bright with the Labour candidate coming in second place. In March 2021, Andrea Mann, a Labour councillor for Churchill ward, resigned for family reasons. The by-election to fill the seat was held on 6 May 2021 alongside the 2021 London mayoral election and London Assembly election. The Labour candidate Liza Begum won, with an increased majority compared to the 2018 election.

Along with most London boroughs, this election occurred under new ward boundaries. Following local consultation, the Local Government Boundary Commission for England produced new boundaries, reducing the number of councillors from 60 to 54 across eighteen three-councillor wards.

Campaign 
The Conservative peer Robert Hayward listed Westminster as one of four Conservative councils in London that his party risked losing control of in the wake of the partygate scandal. The concentration of Labour voters in a small number of wards means that relatively few seats in the borough are marginal. Labour criticised the Conservative council for the Marble Arch Mound's cost, which had led to the resignation of the council's deputy leader Melvyn Caplan. Fitzrovia News wrote that the new West End ward would be competitive between Labour and the Conservatives, with Labour having won one of the three seats on previous boundaries.

Electoral process 
Westminster, as with all other London borough councils, elects all of its councillors at once every four years, with the previous election having taken place in 2018. At the same time elections were held for the 12 seats of Queen's Park Community Council, the Parish council  in the north west of the city, with these being administered by the Returning Officer at the City Council and both elections were counted together overnight.

The elections took place by multi-member first-past-the-post voting, with each ward being represented by three councillors. Electors have as many votes as there are councillors to be elected in their ward, with the top being elected.

All registered electors (British, Irish, Commonwealth and European Union citizens) living in London aged 18 or over were entitled to vote in the election. People who live at two addresses in different councils, such as university students with different term-time and holiday addresses, were entitled to be registered for and vote in elections in both local authorities. Voting in-person at polling stations took place from 7:00 to 22:00 on election day, and voters were able to apply for postal votes or proxy votes in advance of the election.

Previous council composition

Results summary

Ward results 
Candidates seeking re-election are marked with an asterisk (*). Councillors seeking re-election for a different ward are marked with a cross (†).

Abbey Road

Bayswater

Church Street

Harrow Road

Hyde Park

Knightsbridge & Belgravia

Lancaster Gate

Little Venice

Maida Vale

Marylebone

Pimlico North 
Pimlico North is a new ward that was formed from multiple old wards. There is no previous result to compare to.

Pimlico South 
Pimlico South is a new ward that was formed from multiple old wards. There is no previous result to compare to.

Queen's Park

Regent's Park

St James's

Vincent Square

West End

Westbourne

Queen's Park (Community Council) 
Elections to Queen's Park Community Council were held alongside the City Council elections.  Nine candidates were returned unopposed in three wards, while the fourth ward was contested returning the votes shown below. The Community Council was counted at the same time as the City Council seats.

References 

Elections in the City of Westminster
Westminster